Combined Military Hospitals (abbreviated as CMH) are Pakistan Armed Forces hospitals situated in various cantonments of Pakistan.

History 
During the British Raj, the British Indian Army troops depended for their medical treatment entirely on their regimental hospitals. In October 1918, Station Hospitals were sanctioned for the Indian troops. The Indian Hospital Corps (IHC) initially was divided into 10 Division Companies, which corresponded to the 10 existing Military Divisions in India and Burma. They were located at Peshawar, Rawalpindi, Lahore, Multan, Quetta, Mhow, Poona, Meerut, Lucknow, Secunderabad and Rangoon.

The whole corps was re-organized on command basis five companies of the IHC were created in 1932. No 1 Company was at Rawalpindi, No 2 Company at Lucknow, No 3 Company at Poona, No 4 Company at Quetta and No 5 Company at Rangoon. The World War II was responsible for rapid developments. The idea of having a homogeneous corps by amalgamating Indian Medical Services, Indian Medical Department (IMD) and Indian Hospital Corps gradually took shape and Indian Army Medical Corps (IAMC) came into being on 3 April 1943. The medical institutions of the IAMC were concentrated in the areas, which were to subsequently become Pakistan.

The British Raj in India had left its legacies in the territory, which later became Pakistan. The bulk of the troops of the British Indian Army were recruited from the areas, which became Pakistan. The threats of the Russian empire and a fear of Afghans and Central Asians overrunning the Indian territory had made the British rulers wary of the northwestern borders across the Hindu Kush mountains. The army was deployed at large scale. Rawalpindi was the pivotal military base, from where they controlled the command, logistics and services provided to those troops. It was the Headquarters, Northern Command (India).

Armed Forces Medical Services were one of the most organized and highly developed support services in the British Indian Army. The members of the medical profession served in the Indian Medical Services (IMS), with pride and dignity. The senior jobs in civil medical services were also reserved for the medical professionals of the army.

The troops of British Indian Army were deployed over an extensive area. They were exposed to the tropical climate. They were present in the heights of Chitral in the north-west to Burma in the east. The major bulk of their health related problems were of tropical infections and parasitic infestation. The medical services were committed for the prevention and treatment of tropical diseases.

Combined Military Hospital (CMH) and Military Hospital (MH) were the largest and the most well-equipped hospitals in this area at that time.

Role and task 
Medical Treatment
Combined Military Hospitals provide in-patient and out-patient medical and surgical treatment to the military as well as civilian population.

Training
CMHs serve as training centres for medical cadets, internees, post-graduate fellowship trainees, nursing cadets and nursing officers, and the paramedical staff.

Preventive Health
The CMHs also oversee the preventive aspects of health care provision in the cantonments.

Health surveillance
Health surveillance of the military personnel is done through annual medical check-ups

Research and development
This is done as isolated local projects in individual hospitals or as a part of army wide studies in all CMHs on subjects related to health of troops.

Administration
The administration is carried out by the Health Care Administrators(GDMOs) while the patient management and care is primarily the responsibility of the doctors of specialist cadre. These hospitals are run by the doctors of Pakistan's Army Medical Corps. CMHs are classified into A, B and C classes depending upon their capabilities and generally correspond to tertiary care, secondary care and primary level care hospitals respectively.

Class

Class A hospitals 
A Brigadier (or in some cases a Major General) is the "Commandant" of an A-Class CMH, who is assisted by a Second-in-Command (2IC). Colonel. CMHs at Rawalpindi and Lahore are commanded by Major Generals.
 CMH Rawalpindi (with a capacity of 1150 beds as of 2019)
 CMH Abbottabad
 CMH Kharian
 CMH Lahore
 CMH Bahawalpur
 CMH Multan
 CMH Pano Aqil
 CMH Peshawar
 CMH Quetta
 CMH Sialkot
 CMH Malir Cantonment, Karachi

Class B hospitals 
A Colonel is the Commanding Officer of the hospital
 CMH Attock
 CMH Gujranwala
 CMH Hyderabad
 CMH Jhelum
 CMH Muzaffarabad
 CMH Nowshehra
 CMH Okara

Class C hospitals 
An officer of the rank of Lieutenant Colonel is the Commanding Officer of this class of CMH

 CMH Badin
 CMH Bannu
 CMH Chitral
 CMH Chunian
 CMH D I Khan
 CMH Gilgit
 CMH Khuzdar
 CMH Kohat
 CMH Landi Kotal
 CMH Mangla
 CMH Mardan
 CMH Murree
 CMH Rawalakot
 CMH Risalpur
 CMH Sibi
 CMH Skardu
 CMH Tarbela
 CMH Thall
 CMH Zhob
 CMH Sargodha

See also 
 Pakistan Air Force Hospitals

References

Military medical facilities in Pakistan
Pakistan Z
Hospital networks in Pakistan